Zofia Eleonora Klengel (1674-1755), was a German aristocrat. She is known as the first known mistress of Augustus II the Strong in 1692–1695.

References

 Sharp, T., Pleasure and Ambition: The Life, Loves and Wars of Augustus the Strong, I. B. Tauris & Co Ltd., 2001, p. 86

1755 deaths
Mistresses of Augustus the Strong
1674 births